Sandy Mitchell may refer to:
 Sandy Mitchell (prisoner)
 Sandy Mitchell (novelist)
 Sandy Mitchell (racing driver)